Anthony Olufunsho Williams (9 May 1948 – 27 July 2006) was an influential politician from Lagos State and former Commissioner under Colonel Olagunsoye Oyinlola's Military Administration in Lagos.

Early life
Funsho Williams attended the St. Paul's Catholic school at Ebute Metta and later St Gregory's College, Lagos. In 1968, he studied at the University of Lagos, attaining a degree in civil engineering. He then went on to attend the New Jersey Institute of Technology for his Master's degree.

Civil service career

In 1974, Williams returned to Nigeria and joined the Lagos State civil service. He spent the next 17 years working on construction projects in Lagos State. Approximately 70% of the roads and bridges were built under his stewardship. Williams was a Permanent Secretary by the time he left the civil service in 1991.

He went into business, but he shortly returned to public service, as a Lagos state Commissioner under Colonel Olagunsoye Oyinlola's  Military Administratorship.

Political career

In the mid-1990s, Williams decided to enter into politics in order that he could formulate policy, rather than just carry it out. He first joined the United Nigeria Congress Party (UNCP), but after the suspicious death of its leader, General Sani Abacha he moved to the Alliance for Democracy (AD).

After a short time, Williams again switched parties, this time to the People's Democratic Party (PDP).They had won the 2003 elections under the leadership of President Olusegun Obasanjo.

Williams had stood twice before in the Lagos State Governorship (Gubernatorial) election. At the time of his death he was hoping to be nominated as the PDP Gubernatorial candidate for Lagos State. He had vowed to wrest control of the wealthy state from the Alliance for Democracy Party.

Positions

Williams held directorships in several companies:
Julius Berger Nigeria Plc
Cappa and D'Alberto Plc
Ajaokuta Steel Company
Chairman of the board of directors of the National Maritime Authority

Murder

On July 27, 2006, Funsho Williams was found bound, strangled, and stabbed at his home in Dolphin Estate, Ikoyi, an exclusive and wealthy neighborhood in Lagos.

On July 28, 2006, two people were arrested in connection with his death. One was his campaign manager, and the other was a senator and former Works Minister Kingsley Adeseye Ogunlewe. Ogunlewe was also hoping to be the PDP Gubernatorial candidate..

Williams was laid to rest at the Victoria Court Cemetery, Lagos. He was survived by his wife, Hilda, and four children.

Memorial 
On February 26, 2007, approximately seven months after the murder incident, the then Lagos State governor, Governor Bola Ahmed Tinubu in honor of the late iconic character, renamed the longest and the popular Western Avenue highway in Lagos to Funsho William Avenue. Yet, it is still known to most Lagosians as Western Avenue highway.

References

External links
Official website of the Lagos State Government.

1948 births
Yoruba politicians
Politicians from Lagos
University of Lagos alumni
Nigerian civil engineers
Lagos State civil servants
New Jersey Institute of Technology alumni
United Nigeria Congress Party politicians
Alliance for Democracy (Nigeria) politicians
Peoples Democratic Party (Nigeria) politicians
People murdered in Lagos
Assassinated Nigerian politicians
2006 deaths
St Gregory's College, Lagos alumni
Burials at Victoria Court Cemetery
Yoruba engineers
Commissioners of ministries of Lagos State
2006 murders in Nigeria
Nigerian corporate directors
Yoruba businesspeople
Assassinated businesspeople
Businesspeople from Lagos